Garth Norman (born 26 November 1938) was Archdeacon of Bromley & Bexley from 1994 until 2003.

He was educated at Henry Mellish Grammar School, Durham University (BA, DipTh, MA), the University of East Anglia (MEd) and the University of Cambridge (PGCE). He was ordained in 1964. After that he was Principal of the Chiltern Christian Training Scheme in the Diocese of Oxford from, 1983 to 1988; and Director of Training in the Diocese of Rochester from 1988 until his archidiaconal appointment.

References

1938 births
People educated at Henry Mellish Grammar School
Alumni of the University of East Anglia
Alumni of the University of Cambridge
Archdeacons of Bromley
Living people
Alumni of St Chad's College, Durham